Paris, Texas is a 1984 road movie directed by Wim Wenders and co-written by L. M. Kit Carson and Sam Shepard. It stars Harry Dean Stanton, Dean Stockwell, Nastassja Kinski, Aurore Clément and Hunter Carson. In the film, disheveled recluse
Travis Henderson (Stanton) reunites with his brother Walt (Stockwell) and son Hunter (Carson); Travis and Hunter then embark on a trip through the American Southwest to track down Travis' missing wife, Jane (Kinski).

The film is a co-production between companies in France and West Germany, and was filmed primarily in west Texas. Cinematography was performed by Robby Müller. while the musical score was composed by Ry Cooder. 

At the 1984 Cannes Film Festival, it won the Palme d'Or from the official jury, as well as the FIPRESCI Prize and the Prize of the Ecumenical Jury. It went on to other honors and critical acclaim.

Plot
Travis Henderson walks alone through the West Texas desert in a fugue state, before stumbling into a bar and losing consciousness. A German doctor examines him and determines he is mute, but discovers he possesses a telephone number and calls it. The call is answered by Walt Henderson, Travis' brother from Los Angeles. Walt has not seen or had contact with Travis for four years, and agrees to travel to Terlingua, Texas, to retrieve him. His French wife, Anne, is concerned about the matter, as they have informally adopted Travis' son Hunter, with Hunter's biological mother Jane also missing. Walt reaches Terlingua, and finds Travis wandering from the clinic where he was found. The two brothers begin driving back to Los Angeles. With Walt becoming increasingly frustrated with Travis' muteness, Travis finally utters the name "Paris", asking to go there. Walt mistakenly assumes he means Paris, France. Farther down the road, Travis shows Walt a photograph of empty property in Paris, Texas, which he had purchased, believing he was conceived in that town.

The brothers reach Los Angeles where Travis is reunited with Hunter. Hunter, aged seven, has very little memory of his father, and is wary of Travis until the family watches home movies from days when they were all together. Hunter realizes that Travis still loves Jane. As Hunter and Travis become reacquainted, Anne reveals to Travis that Jane has had contact with her, and makes monthly deposits into a bank account for Hunter. Anne has traced the deposits to a bank in Houston. Travis realizes he can possibly see Jane if he is at the Houston bank on the day of the next deposit, only a few days away. He acquires a cheap vehicle and borrows money from Walt. When he tells Hunter he is leaving, Hunter wishes to go with him, though he does not have Walt or Anne's permission.

Travis and Hunter drive to Houston, while Hunter recounts the Big Bang and the origins of Earth. A couple of hours after arriving at the Houston bank, Hunter identifies his mother in a car, making a drive-in deposit. He calls for Travis via walkie-talkie, and they follow her car to a peep-show club where she works. While Hunter waits outside, Travis goes in, finding the business has rooms with one-way mirrors, where clients converse with strippers via telephone. He eventually sees Jane, though she cannot see him, and leaves.

The next day, Travis leaves Hunter at the Méridien Hotel in downtown Houston, with a message that he feels obliged to reunite mother and son, as he feels responsible for separating them in the first place. Travis returns to the peep show. Seeing Jane again, and with her seemingly unaware of who he is, he tells her a story, ostensibly about other people.

He describes a man and younger girl who meet, marry and have a child. When the child is born, the wife suffers from postpartum blues and dreams of escaping from the family. The husband descends into alcoholism and becomes abusive, imprisoning her in the trailer they live in. After a failed attempt to escape, the man ties the woman to the trailer stove and goes to bed, dreaming of withdrawing to an unknown place "without language or streets" while his wife and child scream from the kitchen. He wakes up to find the trailer on fire and his family gone, and in despair runs for five days until leaving civilization entirely.

Jane realizes she is speaking with Travis, and that he is recounting the story of their relationship. He tells her that Hunter is in Houston and needs his mother. Jane has longed to be reunited with her boy, and that night, enters the hotel room where Hunter is waiting, while Travis watches from the parking lot. As Jane embraces Hunter, Travis climbs into his vehicle and drives away.

Cast
In order of their appearance

Production

Development

West German director Wim Wenders had travelled to the United States and stated he wished "to tell a story about America". The film is named for the Texas city of Paris, but not set there in any scene. Instead, Paris is referred to as the location of a vacant lot owned by Travis that is seen in a photograph, and is used as a metaphor. Wenders had taken photographs like it while location scouting in the western U.S. earlier in his career, photographing locations such as Las Vegas and Corpus Christi, Texas.

Screenwriter Sam Shepard met Wenders to discuss writing and/or acting for Wenders' project Hammett. Shepard said he was uninterested in writing Hammett, but they considered loosely adapting Shepard's Motel Chronicles, and developed a story of brothers, one having lost his memory. Their script grew to 160 pages, as the brother-brother relationship lessened in importance, and numerous endings were considered. Little of the funding for the project originated from Germany.

The film shares similar traits to Wenders' 1974 film Alice in the Cities (Alice in den Städten).

Casting

Harry Dean Stanton had appeared in 100 films before Paris, Texas, with small roles in Cool Hand Luke and a large part in Repo Man, which came out the same year as Paris, Texas. He embraced the leading part of Travis, saying "After all these years, I finally got the part I wanted to play". However, Wenders also said Stanton was unsure of his part, and the age disparity between himself and the younger Nastassja Kinski (he was 34 years older). Wenders stated he had discovered Dean Stockwell as he was prepared to quit acting, finding no desirable roles and considering beginning a career in real estate. Hunter Carson was the son of co-screenwriter L. M. Kit Carson, and agreed to act while accompanied by his mother, Karen Black, who helped him memorize the dialogue.

Kinski wrote a diary for the character Jane to develop her backstory, imagining her emigrating from Europe, and getting more affection from Travis than she had from anyone. According to Stockwell, his character in early drafts was intended to travel with Hunter, Travis and Anne before Anne turned back to Los Angeles and Walt became lost in the desert, paralleling Travis in the first scene. Stockwell and Aurore Clément's parts were later reduced.

Filming
Wenders said the film, shot in only four to five weeks, with only a small group working the last weeks, was very short and fast. There was a break in shooting during which time the script was completed. Filmmaker Allison Anders worked as a production assistant on the film, while Claire Denis served as assistant director. Filming largely occurred in Fort Stockton and Marathon in the Trans-Pecos region of west Texas. The film marked Wenders' first time avoiding storyboarding completely, going straight to rehearsals on location before shooting.

Shooting had already started in 1983 when the screenplay was still incomplete, with the objective of filming in the order of the story. Shepard planned to base the rest of the story on the actors' observations and their understanding of the characters. However, when Shepard moved on to another job, he sent Wenders notes on how the screenplay should end instead. Shepard credited Wenders and L. M. Kit Carson with the idea of a peep show and the story's final acts. The filmmakers opted not to portray a realistic peep show, as they needed a format that allowed for  more communication between the characters. Kinski could not see anyone, only a mirror, in the peep show scenes, and said this created a genuine feeling of solitude.

Challenges arose when the film ran short of finances, but Wenders was encouraged when they completed the scene with Kinski, remarking, "it dawned on me that we were going to touch people in a big way. I was a little scared by the idea".

Themes and interpretation

Robert Phillip Kolker and Peter Beickene wrote the film presents the U.S. as "a fantasyland, a place of striking images, a mise-en-scène of desert and city". Aside from the landscape, there are references to U.S. culture and film, and similarities to John Ford's 1956 film The Searchers. Academic Roger Cook argued there is a connection between the character of Travis and his surroundings observable on the ride to California. The character gradually moves from the "desolate" to civilization, and Travis continually tries to break away from this difficult transition. His vehicles of choice possibly also reflect his characterization, as his preferred rental car has a bump, and he switches to a clearly used 1958 Ford Ranchero for his return to Texas.

Thomas Elsaesser discussed how Paris, Texas fit in with Wenders' depiction of women, saying many of the travels in his filmography are to find a particular woman. In the case of Paris, Texas, this is with the aim of "escaping her 'now' in order to find her as she was 'then'". Kolker and Beickene commented on the lack of touch, or even "emotional fulfillment" between Travis and Jane at the end, aside from their faces merging in the glass and their discussions of their emotions.

Marc Silberman examined how personal identity is also a theme in the film, as the name "Paris" is deceptive, conjuring images of France but referring to Texas. This is evident in what Travis refers to as "Daddy's joke" about Travis' mother being from Paris, and his belief that he was conceived there causes him to believe going there will achieve self-realization. Elsaesser believed the ending signified Travis sending Hunter in his stead to reunite with Jane. Elsaesser found this to be an example of a complicated system in which various characters see each other through fantasy, and remake each other as they desire. Travis' father had seen his mother as a Parisian, and this became "a sickness".

Cook opined that returning to the sanctuary of the road is Travis' response to having suffered the worst modern American experience, turning his son over to the boy's mother. Stan Jones suggested the story involves a European theory on perception, as Travis evolves as a character from the one who perceives, to a driving force, returning to perceiving, and then withdrawing. Jones quoted French critic Jean-Louis Comolli: "Never passive, a spectator works". The ending can also suggest hope for a fresh start for Jane and Hunter.  Wenders himself said it marked a beginning for the next chapter in his own filmography, explaining Travis' exit: "This scene for me had a liberating effect ... I let him disappear in my own way, and all my previous male characters went with him. They have all taken up residence in a retirement home on the outskirts of Paris, Texas".

Paris, Texas belongs in the road movie genre, but The Guardian critic Guy Lodge suggested it could also be considered a western film. Stan Jones noted Mark Luprecht had classified Paris, Texas as a tragedy and had detected Oedipal themes in its depiction of family.

Style
Paris, Texas is notable for its images of the Texas landscape and climate. Wenders had emphasized roads in his earlier works, particularly his Road Movie trilogy, to depict "characters' journeys", with the setting of Texas removing the cultural boundaries of Europe. The opening gives an aerial perspective of the dry desert. Critic Emanuel Levy noted the shots that follow of "billboards, placards, graffiti, rusty iron carcasses, old railway lines, neon signs, motels". The film's production design was by Kate Altman. Cinematographer Robby Müller had frequently worked with Wenders, and the photography in Paris, Texas is characteristic of Müller's style, which director Steve McQueen defined as "a visual language to capture what appear to be men falling to their deaths in slow motion". Senses of Cinema critic Lee Hill also compared it to the art of Edward Hopper and Edward Ruscha.

The film is accompanied by a slide-guitar score by Ry Cooder, employing Blind Willie Johnson's "Dark Was the Night, Cold Was the Ground", which Cooder hailed as "the most transcendent piece in all American music". Screen International editor Nick Roddick wrote the music gives "a quality of yearning to the bleakness of the landscape". In 2018, Cooder revealed a specific source of inspiration during an interview on BBC Radio 4: "[Wenders] did a very good job at capturing the ambience out there in the desert, just letting the microphones ... get tones and sound from the desert itself, which I discovered was in the key of E♭ ... that's the wind, it was nice. So we tuned everything to E♭".

Release

Paris, Texas competed at the 1984 Cannes Film Festival, with Wenders claiming that Stanton was so anxious about Cannes that they hired Sean Penn to assist with Stanton's preparations for the screening. Roddick remarked on how the film's affectionate portrayal of the U.S. was well received by European filmmakers at Cannes at a time of high anti-Americanism, given the presidency of Ronald Reagan.

Conflicts between Wenders' Road Movies company and distributor Filmverlag over how many copies of Paris, Texas should be released in West Germany following Cannes caused it to be initially denied a theatrical release there, so bus tours were launched to transport German viewers to Zürich for showings. Road Movies launched a lawsuit to sever ties with Filmverlag, and the film reached West German theatres eight months later.

It was screened at the Sundance Film Festival in 1985 and again in 2006 as part of the Sundance Collection category. It returned to Cannes for the Cannes Classics section of the 2014 Festival, after being restored by Cinepost. The film has been released on DVD and Blu-ray in Region 1 by The Criterion Collection.

Reception

Critical reception
Roger Ebert gave the film four stars, writing "Paris, Texas is a movie with the kind of passion and willingness to experiment that was more common fifteen years ago than it is now. It has more links with films like Five Easy Pieces and Easy Rider and Midnight Cowboy, than with the slick arcade games that are the box-office winners of the 1980s. It is true, deep, and brilliant". Varietys Holly Willis praised the cinematography, and credited Wenders for a worthy European portrait of the U.S. Vincent Canby of The New York Times gave the film a mixed review, writing, "The film is wonderful and funny and full of real emotion as it details the means by which Travis and the boy become reconciled. Then it goes flying out the car window when father and son decide to take off for Texas in search of Jane". David Denby criticized Paris, Texas in New York, calling it "lifeless" and a "fiasco". Texas Monthly boasted Paris, Texas was "The hottest Texas town in France", noting Le Monde placed a rave review of the film on its first page.

It has had an enduring legacy among critics and film aficionados.  In 2015, Guy Lodge of The Guardian named it a favorite Palme d'Or-winner, while Texas Monthly included it in its Best Texas Movies list for its depiction of Marathon, Texas. During the same year, Paris, Texas appeared on a posthumous list of Akira Kurosawa's 100 favorite movies. In 2016, Entertainment Weekly also included it in The 25 Best Texas Movies, while The Texas Observer critic Michael Agresta credited it with creating "a certain flavor of Texas cool". However, that year The Hollywood Reporter argued its prestige had lessened somewhat, naming it the 44th best Palme d'Or-winner to date. Paris, Texas has a 94% approval rating on Rotten Tomatoes, a review aggregator, based on 49 reviews with an average rating of 8.2 out of 10. The website's critical consensus reads, "A quiet yet deeply moving kind of Western, Paris, Texas captures a place and people like never before (or after)".

Accolades
At Cannes, the film won three prizes: the Palme d'Or, the FIPRESCI Prize, and the Prize of the Ecumenical Jury. The decision from the main jury on the Palme d'Or was unanimous, with one of the members being French cinematographer Henri Alekan.

Legacy
The Irish rock group U2 cited Paris, Texas as an inspiration for their album The Joshua Tree. The Scottish bands Travis and Texas both took their names from this film. Musicians Kurt Cobain and Elliott Smith said this was their favorite film of all time. The film has also influenced later directors, with David Robert Mitchell, who made It Follows (2014), saying the aesthetics in its framing and composition were instructive. Wes Anderson was also inspired by Wenders' home movie scene with the photographs of the dead wife in The Royal Tenenbaums (2001).

In 1986, the photography Wenders took on his location scout for Paris, Texas was exhibited at the Centre Georges Pompidou in Paris, France, under the title Written in the West. In 2000, these were published in a book also titled Written in the West, with additional material in Written in the West, Revisited in 2015.

References

Bibliography

External links
 
 
 
 
 
Paris, Texas: On the Road Again an essay by Nick Roddick at the Criterion Collection

1984 drama films
1980s drama road movies
1984 films
American drama road movies
English-language German films
English-language French films
Films about domestic violence
Films about atonement
Films scored by Ry Cooder
Films directed by Wim Wenders
Films produced by Anatole Dauman
Films set in Houston
Films set in Texas
Films set in Los Angeles
Films shot in Houston
Films shot in Texas
Films shot in Los Angeles
Films whose director won the Best Direction BAFTA Award
French drama road movies
French independent films
German drama road movies
German independent films
Palme d'Or winners
Paris, Texas
Films with screenplays by Sam Shepard
West German films
1984 independent films
1980s English-language films
1980s French films
1980s German films
Foreign films set in the United States